Nossa Senhora (Portuguese for "Our Lady") may refer to the following places:

Angola
Estádio Nossa Senhora do Monte, multi-use stadium
Pavilhão Nossa Senhora do Monte, indoor sporting arena

Brazil
Nossa Senhora Aparecida, Sergipe
Nossa Senhora da Glória, Sergipe
Nossa Senhora das Dores, Sergipe
Nossa Senhora de Lourdes, Sergipe
Nossa Senhora do Livramento, Mato Grosso
Nossa Senhora do Socorro
Nossa Senhora dos Remédios, Piauí
Nossa Senhora do Pau Assado, Aracajú

Cape Verde
Nossa Senhora da Ajuda (parish)
Nossa Senhora da Conceição (São Filipe)
Nossa Senhora da Graça (Praia)
Nossa Senhora da Lapa (Ribeira Brava)
Nossa Senhora da Luz (Maio)
Nossa Senhora da Luz (São Domingos)
Nossa Senhora da Luz (São Vicente)
Nossa Senhora das Dores (Sal)
Nossa Senhora do Livramento
Nossa Senhora do Monte
Nossa Senhora do Rosário (Ribeira Brava)
Nossa Senhora do Rosário (Ribeira Grande)

India (Portuguese East Indies)

Catedral de Nossa Senhora dos Milagres
Igreja de Nossa Senhora dos Milagres (Mangalore)

Portugal
Nossa Senhora da Conceição (Alandroal), a parish in the Alandroal Municipality
Nossa Senhora da Conceição (Angra do Heroísmo), Azores
Nossa Senhora da Conceição (Vila Real), a parish in the municipality of Vila Real
Nossa Senhora do Monte (Portugal), Madeira
Nossa Senhora do Pópulo, a parish in the municipality of Caldas da Rainha
Nossa Senhora do Rosário, a parish in the municipality of Lagoa, Azores
Nossa Senhora dos Remédios (Povoação), Azores

Churches and buildings
Church of Nossa Senhora da Conceição Velha, Lisbon, Portugal
Church of Nossa Senhora da Nazaré, Nazaré, Portugal
Nossa Senhora da Conceição Fortress, Póvoa de Varzim, Portugal